The 2010 Australia Day Honours are appointments to various orders and honours to recognise and reward good works by Australian citizens. The list was announced on 26 January 2010 by the Governor General of Australia, Quentin Bryce.

The Australia Day Honours are the first of the two major annual honours lists, the first announced to coincide with Australia Day (26 January), with the other being the Queen's Birthday Honours, which are announced on the second Monday in June.

† indicates an award given posthumously.

Order of Australia

Companion (AC)

General Division

Military Division

Officer (AO)

General Division

Military Division

Member (AM)

General Division

Military Division

Medal (OAM)

General Division

Military Division

Meritorious Service

Public Service Medal (PSM)

Australian Police Medal (APM)

Australian Fire Service Medal (AFSM)

Ambulance Service Medal (ASM)

Emergency Service Medal (ESM)

Gallantry, Distinguished and Conspicuous Service

Star of Gallantry (SG)

Medal for Gallantry (MG)

Distinguished Service Cross (DSC)

Distinguished Service Medal (DSM)

Commendation for Distinguished Service

Commendation for Gallantry

Conspicuous Service Cross (CSC)

Conspicuous Service Medal (CSM)

References

External links
Order of Australia Honours Lists 1975–2011, www.gg.gov.au
Australia Day 2010 Honours Lists, Governor-General of Australia: The Australian Honours Secretariat
 Officer (AO) in the General Division of the Order of Australia, www.gg.gov.au
 Officer (AO) in the Military Division of the Order of Australia, www.gg.gov.au
 Member (AM) in the General Division of the Order of Australia (A-L), www.gg.gov.au
 Member (AM) in the General Division of the Order of Australia (M-Z) , www.gg.gov.au
 Member (AM) in the Military Division of the Order of Australia, www.gg.gov.au
 Medal (OAM) of the Order of Australia in the General Division (A-E), www.gg.gov.au
 Medal (OAM) of the Order of Australia in the General Division (F-L), www.gg.gov.au
 Medal (OAM) of the Order of Australia in the General Division (M-R), www.gg.gov.au
 Medal (OAM) of the Order of Australia in the General Division (S-Z), www.gg.gov.au
 Medal (OAM) of the Order of Australia in the Military Division, www.gg.gov.au
 Public Service Medal (PSM), www.gg.gov.au
 Australian Police Medal (APM), www.gg.gov.au
 Australian Fire Service Medal (AFSM), www.gg.gov.au
 Ambulance Service Medal (ASM), www.gg.gov.au
 Emergency Services Medal (ESM) , www.gg.gov.au
 Star of Gallantry (SG), www.gg.gov.au
 Medal for Gallantry (MG), www.gg.gov.au
 Distinguished Service Cross (DSC), www.gg.gov.au
 Distinguished Service Medal (DSM), www.gg.gov.au
 Commendation for Distinguished Service, www.gg.gov.au
 Commendation for Gallantry, www.gg.gov.au
 Conspicuous Service Cross (CSC), www.gg.gov.au
 Conspicuous Service Medal (CSM)

2010 awards in Australia
Orders, decorations, and medals of Australia